The Delaware Fightin' Blue Hens football team, representing the University of Delaware, has had 29 players drafted into the National Football League (NFL) since the league began holding drafts in 1936. This includes one player taken in the first round, Joe Flacco in the 2008 NFL Draft. The Oakland/Los Angeles Raiders franchise has drafted the most Fightin' Blue Hens with five. Fifteen NFL teams have drafted at least one player from Delaware. Two former Blue Hens have been selected to Pro Bowls: Rich Gannon, who earned four selections as a member of the Raiders after being selected in the fourth round of the 1987 NFL draft by the New England Patriots, and Mike Adams, who earned two selections as a member of the Indianapolis Colts after going undrafted in 2004.

Each NFL franchise seeks to add new players through the annual NFL Draft. The draft rules were last updated in 2009. The team with the worst record the previous year picks first, the next-worst team second, and so on. Teams that did not make the playoffs are ordered by their regular-season record with any remaining ties broken by strength of schedule. Playoff participants are sequenced after non-playoff teams, based on their round of elimination (wild card, division, conference, and Super Bowl).

Before the merger agreements in 1966, the American Football League (AFL) operated in direct competition with the NFL and held a separate draft. This led to a massive bidding war over top prospects between the two leagues. As part of the merger agreement on June 8, 1966, the two leagues would hold a multiple round "Common Draft". Once the AFL officially merged with the NFL in 1970, the "Common Draft" simply became the NFL Draft.

Key

Selections

American Football League

National Football League

Notes

References
General

 
 

Specific

Delaware Fightin' Blue Hens

Delaware Fightin' Blue Hens NFL Draft